John Blithe (died 1410) of Wells, Somerset, was an English politician.

Family
He married Christine Plomer. After Blithe's death, she married another Wells MP, Richard Setter.

Career
He was a Member (MP) of the Parliament of England for Wells in 1388, 1393 and 1399.

References

14th-century births
1410 deaths
14th-century English politicians
English MPs September 1388
English MPs 1393
English MPs 1399
People from Wells, Somerset
Year of birth unknown
Place of birth unknown
Date of death unknown